Sandyaraag  is a black and white Assamese language film, directed and produced by Bhabendra Nath Saikia.  It was released in theatre in 1977.   The film was based on a story titled 'Banprastha'. The screenplay and dialogues were written by the director himself. Sandhyaraag was awarded with Silver Medal for best Assamese film in the 25th National Film Awards. It is the first Assamese film to be showcased in the Indian Panorama.

Cast

References

External links 
 

1977 films
Films set in Assam
Best Assamese Feature Film National Film Award winners
1970s Assamese-language films